Kimulidae is a small neotropical family of the harvestman infraorder Grassatores with about thirty described species.

Description
These brown harvestmen dwell in soil and litter.

Distribution
Whereas most species occur in Venezuela, Colombia and the West Indies, the isolated species Tegipiolus pachypus (which was formerly in Zalmoxidae) is found in northeastern Brazil. This species also differs from the others morphologically. Another Brazilian species, Microminua soerenseni Rio de Janeiro, does not belong to this family.

Relationships
Kimulidae are probably closely related to Escadabiidae.

Name
This family was originally called Minuidae, but as the name of the type genus proved invalid, the family name needed a replacement.

Species

 Acanthominua Sørensen, 1932
 Acanthominua tricarinata Sørensen, 1932 — Venezuela

 Euminua Sørensen, 1932
 Euminua brevitarsa Sørensen, 1932 — Venezuela

 Euminuoides Mello-Leitão, 1935
 Euminuoides longitarsa (Sørensen, 1932) — Venezuela

 Fudeci M. A. González-Sponga, 1997
 Fudeci curvifemur González-Sponga, 1997 — Venezuela

 Jimeneziella Avram, 1970 — Cuba
 Jimeneziella decui Avram, 1970
 Jimeneziella negreai Avram, 1970

 Kimula Goodnight & Goodnight, 1942
 Kimula banksi Silhavy, 1969 — Cuba
 Kimula cokendopheri Pérez-González & Armas, 2000 — Dominican Republic
 Kimula elongata Goodnight & Goodnight, 1942 — Puerto Rico
 Kimula goodnightiorum Silhavy, 1969 — Cuba
 Kimula levii Silhavy, 1969 — Cuba
 Kimula tuberculata Goodnight & Goodnight, 1943 — Cuba
 Kimula turquinensis Silhavy, 1969 — Cuba
 Kimula botosaneanui S. Avram, 1973 — Cuba

 Microminua Sørensen, 1932
 Microminua parvula Sørensen, 1932 — Venezuela
 Microminua soerenseni H. E. M. Soares & B. A. Soares, 1954 — Brazil (Rio de Janeiro) (not Kimulidae, probably Gonyleptidae, Tricommatinae)

 Minua Sørensen, 1932 — Venezuela
 Minua barloventensis (M. A. González-Sponga, 1987)
 Minua choroniensis (M. A. González-Sponga, 1987)
 Minua crassa (M. A. González-Sponga, 1987)
 Minua denticulata (M. A. González-Sponga, 1987)
 Minua dimorpha Sørensen, 1932
 Minua elias Sørensen, 1932
 Minua guatopensis (M. A. González-Sponga, 1987)
 Minua montis (M. A. González-Sponga, 1987)
 Minua nebulae (M. A. González-Sponga, 1987)
 Minua parva (M. A. González-Sponga, 1987)
 Minua pinturelensis (M. A. González-Sponga, 1987)
 Minua punctiacuta (M. A. González-Sponga, 1987)
 Minua scabra Sørensen, 1932
 Minua venefica (M. A. González-Sponga, 1987)

 Pseudominua Mello-Leitão, 1933
 Pseudominua convolvulus (Sørensen, 1932) — Venezuela
 Pseudominua peruviana Roewer, 1963 — Peru

 Tegipiolus Roewer, 1949
 Tegipiolus pachypus Roewer, 1949 — Brazil

Footnotes

References
 's Biology Catalog: Minuidae
 , 2003. Annotated catalogue of the Laniatores of the New World (Arachnida, Opiliones). Revista Ibérica de Aracnología, vol. especial monográfico 1: 1-337. 
  (eds.) (2007): Harvestmen - The Biology of Opiliones. Harvard University Press 

Harvestman families